Hyloxalus parcus (Gualaceo rocket frog) is a species of frogs in the family Dendrobatidae. It is endemic to Ecuador where it is only known from its type locality in the Zamora-Santiago Provinceat elevation of  asl.

Hyloxalus parcus has been considered a synonym of Hyloxalus exasperatus, but it is now treated as a valid species. Very little is known about it, and the International Union for Conservation of Nature has assessed Hyloxalus parcus as "Data Deficient" in 2008.

References

parcus
Amphibians of the Andes
Amphibians of Ecuador
Endemic fauna of Ecuador
Amphibians described in 1991